Andrei Volos is a Russian writer.

His first novel  received the State Prize of the Russian Federation in literature and arts for year 2000.

Novels
 Xurramobod «Хуррамабад», 2000 (the Tajik spelling of "-abad" is used in translation because the novel alludes to Dushanbe)
 Real Estate «Недвижимость», 2001
 Maskaw Mecca «Маскавская Мекка», 2003
 Animator «Аниматор», 2005
 The Victor «Победитель», 2008
 Return to Panjrud «Возвращение в Панджруд», 2013

Awards
Writer's literary awards include:
2013: Russian Booker award, for Return to Panjrud
2013: Russian Student Booker award, for Return to Panjrud
2013: Ivan Bunin literary award
2001: State Prize of the Russian Federation in literature and arts, Russia for 2000, for Xurramobod
2000: Novy Mir magazine award, Russia for Xurramobod published in the magazine
1998: Anti-Booker Prize, Russia, for the manuscript of Xurramobod
1998: Moscow Penne Award, Italy, for a series of stories upon which Xurramobod was to be based

References

1955 births
Living people
Russian writers